Dean Douglas Pregerson (born January 28, 1951) is a senior United States district judge of the United States District Court for the Central District of California.

Education and career
Born to a Jewish family in Los Angeles, California, Pregerson received a Bachelor of Arts degree from the University of California, Los Angeles in 1972 and a Juris Doctor from the UC Davis School of Law in 1976. Pregerson began his career as a Parole Hearing Officer with the California Department of Corrections in 1977. In 1978, Pregerson became an Assistant Public Defender in Agana, Guam. Although some public defender services were available in Guam beginning in 1968, Pregerson joined the first class of public defenders in the modern Guam Public Defender Service Corporation. He served in that role for three years before entering private practice in Ventura, California in 1978. Pregerson remained in private practice, specializing in civil litigation, from 1981 until his appointment to the federal judiciary in 1996. During that time, Pregerson served in numerous roles, including as the Vice-President and General Counsel of the Torrance Company. At the time of his appointment, Pregerson was a partner in the firm of Pregerson, Richman & Luna.

Federal judicial service
On January 26, 1996, Pregerson was nominated by President Bill Clinton to a seat on the United States District Court for the Central District of California vacated by A. Wallace Tashima. Pregerson was confirmed by the United States Senate on July 24, 1996, and received his commission on August 1, 1996. He assumed senior status on January 28, 2016.

Notable cases
Pregerson has been involved in many cases related to the entertainment industry, the use of concealed stun belts on prisoners in court, as well as the planned completion of the I-710 Freeway.

Personal life
Pregerson's father, Harry Pregerson, was a federal judge on the United States Court of Appeals for the Ninth Circuit. In December 2013, Pregerson's son, David, age 23, was killed by a hit and run driver while walking home in the Pacific Palisades community of Los Angeles.

In December 2021, Pregerson's wife, Sharon, age 64, died.

See also
List of Jewish American jurists

References

External links 

1951 births
Living people
Judges of the United States District Court for the Central District of California
United States district court judges appointed by Bill Clinton
University of California, Los Angeles alumni
UC Davis School of Law alumni
Public defenders
Lawyers from Los Angeles
20th-century American lawyers
20th-century American judges
21st-century American judges